The 2007–08 Sta. Lucia Realtors season was the 15th season of the franchise in the Philippine Basketball Association (PBA).

Key dates
August 19: The 2007 PBA Draft took place at Market! Market! in Bonifacio Global City, Taguig.

Draft picks

Roster

Depth chart

Philippine Cup

Team standings
Legend:
y-Qualified for semifinals
x-Qualified for quarterfinals
w-Qualified for the wildcard phase
e-Eliminated

Game log

|- bgcolor="#edbebf"
| 1
| October 17
| Purefoods
| 89–96
| Williams (19)
| 
| 
| Araneta Coliseum
| 0–1
|- bgcolor="#edbebf"
| 2
| October 21
| Magnolia
| 96–101
| Yeo (24)
|  
| 
| Araneta Coliseum
| 0–2
|- bgcolor="#bbffbb"
| 3
| October 28
| Talk 'N Text
| 97-87
| Aquino (18) Mendoza (18)
| 
| 
| Araneta Coliseum
| 1–2

|- bgcolor="#edbebf"
| 4
| November 2
| Red Bull
| 94–100
| Williams (20)
| 
| 
| Cuneta Astrodome
| 1–3
|- bgcolor="#bbffbb"
| 5
| November 7
| Air21
| 115-80
| Gonzales (17)
| 
| 
| Cuneta Astrodome
| 2–3
|- bgcolor="#edbebf"
| 6
| November 10
| Brgy.Ginebra
| 90–103
| Yeo (24)
| 
| 
| General Santos
| 2–4
|- bgcolor="#bbffbb"
| 7
| November 14
| Coca Cola
| 97-63
| Yeo (16) Williams (16)
| 
|  
| Araneta Coliseum
| 3–4
|- bgcolor="#bbffbb"
| 8
| November 21
| Welcoat
| 84-83
| Williams (18)
| 
| 
| Araneta Coliseum
| 4–4
|- bgcolor="#edbebf"
| 9
| November 25
| Purefoods
| 81–84
| Williams (27)
| 
| 
| Araneta Coliseum
| 4–5

|-bgcolor="#edbebf"
| 10
| December 1
| Coca Cola
| 79–94
| Williams (18)
| 
| 
| Lucena City
| 4–6
|-bgcolor="#bbffbb"
| 11
| December 5
| Alaska
| 94-88
| Omolon (25)
| 
| 
| Araneta Coliseum
| 5–6
|-bgcolor="#bbffbb"
| 12
| December 9
| Brgy.Ginebra
| 79-78
| Williams (16) Espino (16)
| 
| 
| Cuneta Astrodome
| 6–6
|-bgcolor="#bbffbb"
| 13
| December 14
| Red Bull
| 104-78
| Reyes (26)
| 
| 
| Cuneta Astrodome
| 7–6
|-bgcolor="#bbffbb"
| 14
| December 19
| Alaska
| 101-96
| Williams (21)
| 
| 
| Cuneta Astrodome
| 8–6
|-bgcolor="#bbffbb"
| 15
| December 23
| Talk 'N Text
| 92-91
| Williams (22)
| 
| 
| Cuneta Astrodome
| 9–6
|-bgcolor="#bbffbb"
| 16
| December 28
| Welcoat
| 107-93
| Williams (20)
| 
| 
| Araneta Coliseum
| 10–6

|-bgcolor="#bbffbb"
| 17
| January 6
| Magnolia
| 99-77
| Williams (21)
| Williams (18)
| 
| Araneta Coliseum
| 11–6
|-bgcolor="#bbffbb"
| 18
| January 13
| Air21
| 123-106 
| Omolon (40)
| 
| 
| Araneta Coliseum
| 12–6

Fiesta Conference

Game log

|- bgcolor="#bbffbb"
| 1
| April 2
| Alaska
| 93-86
| Wilson (24)
| Wilson (13)
| 
| Araneta Coliseum
| 1–0
|- bgcolor="#bbffbb"
| 2
| April 6
| Magnolia
| 88-86
| Williams (27)
|  
| 
| Ynares Center
| 2–0
|- bgcolor="#bbffbb"
| 3
| April 12
| Brgy.Ginebra
| 101-97
| 
| 
| 
| Tacloban City
| 3–0
|- bgcolor="#edbebf"
| 4
| April 18
| Talk 'N Text
| 113–115
| Wilson (29)
| 
| 
| Araneta Coliseum
| 3–1
|- bgcolor="#edbebf"
| 5
| April 22
| Coca Cola
| 88–95
| 
| 
| 
| Cuneta Astrodome
| 3–2

|- bgcolor="#bbffbb"
| 6
| May 4
| Welcoat
| 111-97
| Wilson (24)
| 
| 
| Araneta Coliseum
| 4–2
|- bgcolor="#edbebf"
| 7
| May 7
| Red Bull
| 78–105
| Omolon (20)
| 
| 
| Araneta Coliseum
| 4–3
|- bgcolor="#bbffbb"
| 8
| May 11
| Air21
| 113-100
| Wilson (25) Williams (25)
| 
|  
| Araneta Coliseum
| 5–3
|- bgcolor="#edbebf"
| 9
| May 17
| Talk 'N Text
| 80–90
| 
| 
| 
| Cagayan de Oro
| 5–4
|- bgcolor="#bbffbb"
| 10
| May 23
| Welcoat
| 88-79
| Wilson (34)
| 
| 
| Ynares Center
| 6–4
|- bgcolor="#edbebf"
| 11
| May 25
| Purefoods
| 74–82
| 
| 
| 
| Cuneta Astrodome
| 6–5

|-bgcolor="#edbebf"
| 12
| June 1
| Air21
| 93–95 OT
| Williams (27)
| 
| 
| Araneta Coliseum
| 6–6
|-bgcolor="#edbebf"
| 13
| June 6
| Brgy.Ginebra
| 104–112
| Espino (28)
| 
| 
| Cuneta Astrodome
| 6–7
|-bgcolor="#edbebf"
| 14
| June 13
| Magnolia
| 74–80
| Benson (19) 
| 
| 
| Cuneta Astrodome
| 6–8
|-bgcolor="#bbffbb"
| 15
| June 18
| Alaska
| 95-75
| Benson (22)
| 
| 
| Araneta Coliseum
| 7–8
|-bgcolor="#edbebf"
| 16
| June 27
| Purefoods
| 89–104
| Miranda (17)
| 
| 
| Araneta Coliseum
| 7–9

|-bgcolor="#edbebf"
| 17
| July 2
| Coca Cola
| 
| 
| 
| 
| Araneta Coliseum
| 7–10
|-bgcolor="#edbebf"
| 18
| July 6
| Red Bull
| 81–85
| Benson (27)
| 
| 
| Cuneta Astrodome
| 7–11

References

Sta. Lucia Realtors seasons
Sta